Lillebonne is a commune in the Seine-Maritime department in the Normandy region in Northern France. In 2019, it had a population of 8,797.

History
Before the Roman conquest of Gaul, Iuliobona was the capital of the Caletes, or inhabitants of the Pays de Caux. It was destroyed by Julius Caesar and afterwards rebuilt by Augustus. Before it was again ruined by the barbarian invasions, it had become an important centre whence Roman roads branched out in all directions. It was an administrative, military and commercial city located close to the Seine.  This made it a great transportation route between Britannia (modern-day Britain) and the remainder of the Roman Empire. It was also a crossroads of communication in order to bring Roman ways to Harfleur, Étretat, Dieppe, Évreux and Rouen.

The remains of Roman baths and of a theatre capable of holding 3,000 persons have been brought to light. Many Roman and Gallic relics, notably a bronze statue of Apollo (displayed in the Louvre), and two fine mosaics on show in the museum at Rouen, have been found. In the Middle Ages the fortifications of the town were constructed out of materials supplied by the Roman theatre. The town recovered some of its old importance under William the Conqueror.

Lillebonne is the birthplace of the writer Annie Ernaux.

Geography
Lillebonne lies in the valley of the river Bolbec at the foot of wooded hills at the junction of the D982, D29 and the D81 roads.

Demographics

Sights

The church of Notre Dame, partly modern, preserves a Gothic portal of the 16th century, and a graceful tower of the same period. The park contains a fine cylindrical keep and other remains of a castle founded by William the Conqueror and rebuilt in the 13th century.

The Gallo-Roman amphitheatre of Lillebonne was built in the first century, and was altered in the second century so that it could be used as both an amphitheatre and a theatre. Part of its remains are still visible today from Félix Faur Square, and the foundations of some of its remnants (the wings and backdrop) remain under the square.

Economy
The principal industries were cotton-spinning and the manufacture of calico and candles. There was also a prosperous manufacture of starch belonging to the Legrain family.
Petrochemistry is now the main industry in the area, with a part of the nearby Notre-Dame-de-Gravenchon refining and petrochemical complex extending over the Lillebonne commune.

Twin towns
 Wellington, United Kingdom
 Immenstadt, Germany.

See also
Communes of the Seine-Maritime department

References

External links

 Tourism office of Lillebonne 

Communes of Seine-Maritime
Caletes